The 1934 Navy Midshipmen football team represented the United States Naval Academy during the 1934 college football season. In their first season under head coach Tom Hamilton, the Midshipmen compiled a  record and outscored their opponents by a combined score of 138 to 70.

Schedule

References

Navy
Navy Midshipmen football seasons
Navy Midshipmen football